The Big Sevogle River is a Canadian river in central New Brunswick. It consists of two branches, the North Sevogle and South Sevogle Rivers.  Below the confluence of these rivers at the Square Forks, the river is properly referred to as the Big Sevogle River. This name serves to distinguish it from the "Little Sevogle River", a much smaller tributary to the Northwest Miramichi River.

The Mi'kmaq may have referred to the river as Sewokulook, "river of many cliffs", or as Elmunakuncheech, meaning "little beaver hole".

The river rises in the Big Bald Mountain area of the Miramichi Highlands, a region in north-central Northumberland County.  The river flows southeast through heavy forests before joining the Northwest Miramichi River at Big Hole Tract at Indian Reserve 8, several kilometres northeast of Red Bank.

The Big Sevogle River is noted for its Atlantic Salmon fishing, and one of the major salmon pools near the mouth of the river was leased and controlled for many years by the Colgate family of the United States.

The annual Atlantic Salmon Run occurs from mid-June through late September. Angling for Atlantic Salmon in the river is restricted to fly fishing only and all large salmon must be released.

Tributaries
 Mullin Stream
 Clearwater Stream
 Sheephouse Brook

See also
List of rivers of New Brunswick

References

Rivers of New Brunswick
Landforms of Northumberland County, New Brunswick